Wolfdale is a ghost town in Woodbury County, in the U.S. state of Iowa.

History
A post office was established at Wolfdale in 1868, and remained in operation until 1900.

References

Geography of Woodbury County, Iowa